In Australia, the national representative team of many sports has a nickname, used informally when referring to the team in the media or in conversation.  These nicknames are typically derived from well-known symbols of Australia.  Often the nickname is combined with that of a commercial sponsor, such as the "Qantas Wallabies" or the "Telstra Dolphins".  Some names are a portmanteau word with second element -roo, from kangaroo; such as "Olyroos" for the Olympic association football team.

History
The oldest nicknames are Kangaroos and Wallabies for the rugby league football and rugby union teams.  The other names are more recent, mostly invented to help publicise sports not traditionally popular in Australia. Some journalists have criticised the practice as embarrassing, gimmicky, or PR-driven.

The name "Wallabies" was chosen by the 1908 rugby union side, making its first tour of the Northern Hemisphere. British newspapers had already nicknamed the 1905 New Zealand touring team the "All Blacks" from their sporting uniform predominant colour; the 1906 South African tourists had adopted "Springboks". "Rabbits" was first suggested for Australia, but rejected since rabbits there are notorious as pests. Until the 1980s, only touring sides were "Wallabies"; players on the eight tours up to 1984 were "the First Wallabies" up to "the Eighth Wallabies".

The rugby league tour side arrived in Britain later in 1908 with a live kangaroo as mascot and were nicknamed "Kangaroos". "Kangaroos" originally referred only to teams on "Kangaroo Tours" to Britain and France. In 1994 the Australian Rugby League extended the nickname to all internationals for sponsorship reasons, drawing criticism for the break with tradition. The first such game was a 58–0 win over France at Parramatta Stadium on 6 July 1994.

Among the longer-established sports, the test cricket and Davis Cup tennis teams have no common nickname.  Harry Beitzel's 1967 Australian Football World Tour team was unofficially nicknamed the Galahs from their flashy uniform.  Though this side was a precursor of subsequent Australian international rules football teams, the nickname has not been retained.

Australian Tennis magazine invited readers to suggest a nickname for the Davis Cup team in 1996. The Australia Fed Cup team has been called the Cockatoos, first suggested by player Casey Dellacqua in a press conference at the April 2012 match against Germany. The name has been embraced by teammates and used on the website of governing body Tennis Australia.

As part of a 1998 strategic business plan, Cricket Australia surveyed "stakeholders" in 1998 about a possible nickname, to enhance marketing opportunities. State cricket teams in the Sheffield Shield had benefited from adopting nicknames in the 1990s. 69% opposed a national nickname, partly from a sense of decorum and partly because the best names were already taken by other teams.

Athletics Australia held a competition for a nickname for its squad for the 2001 World Athletics Championships. The winning entry was "the Diggers", from the nickname for ANZAC soldiers. This was quickly abandoned after criticism from the Returned and Services League of Australia and others that this was an inappropriate use of the term. The team previously had a little-used nickname, "the Blazers".

In December 2004, the Australian Soccer Association renamed itself Football Federation Australia (FFA) and announced an effort to rebrand association football as "football" rather than "soccer" in Australia. The national team had been nicknamed "the Socceroos" by journalist Tony Horstead on a 1967 tour to South Vietnam. FFA chairman Frank Lowy commented "It has been commonly used and is a much loved name but we may see it fade out as evolution takes place", and suggested few national football teams had nicknames. By 2016, the FFA announcement of Caltex as sponsors was titled "Caltex Australia with the Socceroos all the way".

Table

See also

 Athletic nickname, in the United States
 Lists of nicknames – nickname list articles on Wikipedia
 Sport in New Zealand#National team names

References

Nicknames in sports
Nicknames
Nicknames
Sports culture in Australia